The City of South Brisbane was a local government area on the southern side of the Brisbane River, Queensland, Australia. It was established in 1888 and existed until 1925 when it was amalgamated into the City of Brisbane.

History

When the Town of Brisbane was first established, it was predominantly on the northern bank of the Brisbane River, but included some areas south of the river, including the ward of Kangaroo Point and the ward of South Brisbane, the area between Vulture Street and the river.

The Queensland Government passed the Divisional Boards Act of 1879 to establish a system of Divisional Boards for the purpose of providing local government for portions of the colony outside the boundaries of municipalities. The first Divisional Boards were proclaimed on 11 November 1879. Although the Woolloongabba Division was intended to be one of the first established, some delays occurred and it was not established until 9 January 1880.

The role of a Divisional Board was to provide such public services as:
 transport, including roads and bridges
 public health, including water, sanitation and drainage
 public amenities, including parks and cemeteries, etc.

Divisional boards were intended to administer areas with lower and more sparse population than that of a municipality. However, population of the Woolloongabba Divisional Board grew rapidly as the result of the introduction of a railway line into South Brisbane. On 7 January 1888, the Borough of South Brisbane was proclaimed a separate Municipal Institution. It combined the areas formerly part of the Division of Woolloongabba and the South Ward of the Municipality of Brisbane. However, the ward of Kangaroo Point remained part of the Town of Brisbane.

In 1891, work commenced on the construction of the South Brisbane Town Hall. The building was officially opened on 1 July 1892. Although it was commonly known as the "Town Hall", it was officially called the South Brisbane Municipal Chambers. The town hall is now listed on the Queensland Heritage Register.

The South Brisbane Memorial Park commemorates those of South Brisbane who died in World War I. On 20 May 1921 the South Brisbane City Council set aside a triangular block land bounded by Stanley Street, Vulture Street and Sidon Street opposite the South Brisbane Town Hall. On 6 August 1923 the park was dedicated Governor-General of Australia, Henry Forster.

Mayors

The voters elected aldermen to represent them. The aldermen elected one of their number each year to be mayor; this election took place in February each year.

Significant places
 South Brisbane Town Hall
 South Brisbane Library

References

External links
 

History of Brisbane
Former local government areas of Queensland
1925 disestablishments in Australia